David Lee Child (July 8, 1794September 18, 1874) was an American journalist, best known for the independence of his character, and the boldness with which he denounced social wrongs and abuses. He worked closely with his wife, Lydia Maria Child.

Early life and education
Child was born in West Boylston, Massachusetts on July 8, 1794, and graduated from Harvard in 1817.

Career
Child worked for some time as the sub-master of the Boston Latin School. He was secretary of legation in Lisbon about 1820, and subsequently fought in Spain, “defending what he considered the cause of freedom against her French invaders.” Returning to the United States in 1824, he began in 1825 to study law with his uncle, Tyler Bigelow, in Watertown, Massachusetts, and was admitted to the bar. He went to Belgium in 1836 to study the beet sugar industry, and afterward received a silver medal for the first manufacture of the sugar in the United States.

Child edited the Massachusetts Journal, about 1830, and while a member of the legislature denounced the annexation of Texas, afterward publishing a pamphlet on the subject, entitled Naboth's Vineyard. He was an early member of the anti-slavery society, and in 1832 addressed a series of letters on slavery and the slave trade to Edward S. Abdy, an English philanthropist. He also published ten articles on the same subject (Philadelphia, 1836). During a visit to Paris in 1837 he addressed an elaborate memoir to the Société pour l'abolition d'esclavage, and sent a paper on the same subject to the editor of the Eclectic Review in London. John Quincy Adams was much indebted to Child's facts and arguments in the speeches that he delivered in congress on the Texan question.

Writings
The Taking of Naboth's Vineyard 
The Texan Revolution,

Later life and death
Child died in Wayland, Massachusetts on September 18, 1874 of natural causes.

Personal life
With his wife, novelist Lydia Maria Child, Child edited the Anti-Slavery Standard in New York in 1843–1844.

Notes

References
 

1794 births
1874 deaths
Harvard University alumni
Abolitionists from Boston
People from West Boylston, Massachusetts
Massachusetts lawyers
Writers from Massachusetts
19th-century American lawyers